WHMS-FM (97.5 MHz) is a commercial FM radio station in Champaign, Illinois.  It broadcasts an adult contemporary radio format, switching to Christmas music for part of November and December.  WHMS-FM calls itself "Lite Rock 97.5" and is owned by The News-Gazette, the primary newspaper in the Champaign-Urbana Metropolitan Area. 

WHMS-FM has an effective radiated power (ERP) of 50,000 watts, the maximum for most FM stations in Illinois.  The transmitter is on South Nell Street (U.S. Route 45) at West Windsor Road in Champaign.

Programming
Along with co-owned 1400 WDWS, WHMS-FM is the longtime broadcaster of the University of Illinois sports, simulcasting all Fighting Illini football and men's basketball games.  On weekday evenings, WHMS-FM carries the nationally syndicated Delilah call-in and request show from Premiere Networks.

History
In 1949, the station signed on as WDWS-FM, a sister station to WDWS 1400 AM.  In its first decades, it mostly simulcast WDWS.  In the late 1960s, it switched to a beautiful music format, playing quarter hour sweeps of mostly soft, instrumental cover versions of popular songs, as well as Broadway and Hollywood show tunes.  

In the 1980s, as the easy listening audience was beginning to age, the station added more vocals to the playlist, eventually making the transition to soft adult contemporary music.  It was renamed WHMS-FM in 1988 in honor of Helen M. Stevick, longtime publisher of the News-Gazette.

References

External links
WHMS-FM 97.5

HMS-FM
Champaign, Illinois
Mainstream adult contemporary radio stations in the United States
Radio stations established in 1949
1949 establishments in Illinois